is a common feminine Japanese given name.

Name meanings
Hiroko can be written using different kanji characters and can mean:
裕子, "kind child"
弘子, "Beautiful child"
寛子, " small child"
浩子, "large child"
博子, "wise child"
宏子, "large child"
広子, "broad child"
紘子, "large child"
The name can also be written in hiragana or katakana.

People with the name
 Hiroko Anzai (安西 ひろこ, born 1979), Japanese model and idol
 Hiroko Hatano (畑野 ひろ子, born 1975), Japanese supermodel and actress
, better known as Chikage Oogi, Japanese actress and politician 
, Japanese singer, actress and television personality
, Japanese archer
, Japanese fencer
, Japanese slalom canoeist
 Hiroko Konishi (小西 寛子, born 1975), Japanese voice actress
, Japanese handball player
, Japanese swimmer
, Japanese model
, Japanese writer
 Hiroko Mita (三田 寛子, born 1966), Japanese singer and actress
 Hiroko Moriguchi (森口 博子, born 1968), Japanese singer and tarento
, Japanese swimmer
 Hiroko Nakamura (中村 紘子, 1944-2016), Japanese pianist
, Japanese cyclist
Hiroko Okada (born 1970), Japanese artist
, Japanese sprint canoeist
 Hiroko Ōta (大田 弘子, born 1954), Japanese politician and researcher of economics
, Japanese swimmer
Hiroko Sasaki, Japanese pianist
 Hiroko Sato (佐藤 寛子, born 1985), Japanese gravure idol, actress and singer
, Japanese javelin thrower
 Hiroko Shimabukuro (島袋 寛子, born 1984), Ryukyuan musician
, Japanese ten-pin bowler
 Hiroko Suzuki (鈴木 浩子, born 1975), Japanese professional wrestling valet and promoter
, Japanese voice actress
, Japanese cross-country skier
, better known as Ao Takahashi, Japanese voice actress
, better known as Kaoru Shimamura, Japanese voice actress
 Hiroko Yakushimaru (薬師丸 ひろ子, born 1964), Japanese actress and singer
, Japanese rhythmic gymnast
, Okinawan-born Mahjong player
Hiroko Yamashita (disambiguation), multiple people

Fictional characters
Hiroko Ai, a character in the science fiction novel series Mars trilogy
Hiroko Haruna (aka Laura), a character in the anime series Hamtaro
Hiroko Takashiro (高城 寛子), a character in the anime series Black Bible
Hiroko Katsuki, a character in the anime series  Yuri on Ice 

Japanese feminine given names